The Tang campaign against the Eastern Turks of 629-630 was an armed conflict that resulted in the Tang dynasty destroying the Eastern Turkic Khaganate and annexing its territories.

The Khaganate, led by Illig Qaghan, threatened the Tang early in the reign of Emperor Taizong (r. 626–649). The Tang gained several years to prepare for war by appeasing the Khaganate. The Tang also formed an alliance with the Xueyantuo, Khaganate's vassals seeking independence. The Tang offensive launched in the winter of 629, led by General Li Jing; the Khaganate was destroyed following Illig Qaghan's capture in 630.

Initially, the Tang attempted to settle the Eastern Turks within its borders, and left the territory north of the empire to the Xueyantuo. This changed when Ashina Jiesheshuai, of the Eastern Turkic royal house, attempted to assassinate Taizong. The Eastern Turkic Khaganate, led by Qilibi Khan, was reestablished as a Tang vassal by resettling Eastern Turks between the Great Wall and the Gobi Desert. The new Khaganate was intended to be a buffer against the Xueyantuo. Qilibi Khan's reign collapsed around new year 645 from internal dissent and Xueyantuo pressure.

The Tang made no further attempts to create an Eastern Turkic vassal. The hostile Second Turkic Khaganate was founded by Ilterish Qaghan during the reign of Taizong's successor, Gaozong.

Background 
The Eastern Turkic Khaganate was a vassal of the Sui Empire - the Tang's predecessor - but had rebelled during the reign of Emperor Yang of Sui (r. 604–618). During the Sui breakup late in Yang's reign, the Khaganate supported various claimants to the imperial title to promote conflict and make them subservient to the Khaganate. Among those benefiting from Khaganate support were Emperor Gaozu (founder of the Tang), Xue Ju (Emperor of Qin), Liang Shidu (Emperor of Liang), Liu Wuzhou (Dingyang Khan), Gao Kaidao (Prince of Yan), Dou Jiande (Prince of Xia), and Liu Heita (Prince of Handong). The Tang won hegemony in 623 following the death of Liu Heita. Following the Tang victory, the Khaganate began asserting control over Tang territory through routine raids even though Gaozu remained an ally and tributary. Furthermore, the Khaganate continued to support Liang Shidu (the last competing Chinese claimant to Tang), and harbour Prince Yang Zhengdao and his grandmother Empress Xiao of Sui. The Turkic raids were so serious that Gaozu considered moving the Tang capital from Chang'an to what is now southwestern Henan. The move was supported by crown prince Li Jiancheng, Li Yuanji (Prince of Qi), and the chancellor Pei Ji. Li Shimin, the Prince of Qin and future Emperor Taizong, convinced Gaozu to abandon the proposal by promising to - eventually - defeat the Eastern Turks.

In 626, Li Shimin eliminated his rivals to the throne - Li Jiancheng and supporter Li Yuanji were murdered during the incident at Xuanwu Gate - and became Emperor Taizong by forcing Gaozu to name him crown prince and then to abdicate. Less than a month after Taizong took the throne, a Khaganate raid - led by Illig Qaghan and Ashina Shibobi - began that eventually reached Chang'an. The Eastern Turks withdrew after Taizong personally made tribute - with promises of further tribute - outside the city at the Wei River Bridge.

Détente early in Emperor Taizong's reign 

Relations between the Tang and the Eastern Turkic Khaganate were relatively peaceful in the following years. During that time, the Tang received reports claiming misgovernance and internal dissent within the Khaganate. Khaganate government functions were entrusted to Zhao Deyan (趙德言), from China, whose corruption and complicated regulations alienated the population. Furthermore, Illig Qaghan favoured ethnic Xiongnu over Eastern Turks, leading to rebellions and their suppression. By 627, Taizong considered attacking the Khaganate. Chancellor Xiao Yu supported attacking. Taizong was convinced not to by Zhangsun Wuji, his brother-in-law, who argued that there was no good reason to as the Khaganate had not broken the peace.

At the same time, the Xueyantuo and Uyghurs, vassals of the Khaganate, were growing in strength and becoming difficult to contain. Illig Qaghan's relationship with Ashina Shibobi was deteriorating. Ashina Shibobi was in charge of the eastern Khaganate and was blamed for the gradual independence of the Khitan and Xi tribes. Furthermore, Ashina Shibobi campaign against the Xueyantuo and Uyghurs was a failure and was arrested by Illig Qaghan for a few days. Upon release, Ashina Shibobi rebelled and fought Illig Qaghan in 628.

Taizong and Ashina Shibobi were blood brothers, and Taizong agreed to support Ashina Shibobi, using the opportunity to attack Liang Shidu while Illig Qaghan was occupied. In 628, the rival Liang claim was neutralized. Liang Shidu was assassinated by his cousin Liang Luoren (梁洛仁) while Shuofang (朔方, in modern Yulin, Shaanxi), the Liang capital, was besieged by Taizong's brother-in-law Chai Shao (柴紹); Liang Luoren then surrendered. Around the same time, the Xueyantuo were united by Yi'nan. Taizong sent General Qiao Shiwang (喬師望) to offer Yi'nan the title of Zhenzhupiqie Khan; Yi'nan accepted the title and an alliance with the Tang. Illig Qaghan attempted to counterbalance the alliance with by requesting a marriage alliance. Taizong ignored the request, instead making preparation for an offensive.

Another source says that Illig Qaghan's problems were caused by two unusually cold winters that led to mass livestock deaths and famine. Illig Qaghan responded by raising taxes rather than lowering them which provoked opposition.

Defeat of the Eastern Turks 

The Tang attack was commanded by General Li Jing, who was assisted by General Zhang Gongjin (張公謹). Li Jing had overall command of the army, and directly commanded the main column. Generals Li Shiji, Xue Wanche (薛萬徹), Wei Xiaojie, Li Daozong and Chai Shao commanded the other columns. Bauer describes this as six separate cavalry formations along a 1200 km front. In spring 630, the Tang surprised the Khaganate, captured the Wuyang Range outside the Dingxiang (定襄, in modern Hohhot, Inner Mongolia), and approached the Khaganate court. Li Jing sent spies into Illig Qaghan's camp, who convinced several of Illig Qaghan's close associated - including Kangsumi (康蘇密), Sui Empress Xiao and Yang Zhengdao - to surrender. Illig Qaghan withdrew to the Yin Mountains, where he entered negotiations with Taizong's envoy, Tang Jian (唐儉); Illig Qaghan offered to submit while at the same time considering withdrawing north of the Gobi Desert.

Li Jing and Li Shiji believed that Illig Qaghan was stalling for time; they and Su Dingfang's vanguard combined and attacked Illig Qaghan's tent. Illig Qaghan fled to subordinate khan Ashina Sunishi (阿史那蘇尼失); Princess Yicheng of Sui, his wife, was killed. Illig Qaghan was soon captured by the Tang generals Li Daozong and Zhang Baoxiang (張寶相) and delivered to Chang'an. Turkic nobles largely surrendered to the Tang. The population surrendered to the Tang or Xueyantuo, or fled west to the Western Turkic Khaganate and the nearby kingdoms such as Qocho, Kucha and Tuyuhun.

Aftermath in Mongolia

Initial attempt to settle Eastern Turkic Khaganate's people within the Tang state 

Taizong sought options for the disposition of the Khaganate's population. Reportedly, the majority opinion was for sinicization by scattered resettlement in the Tang prefectures of what are now modern Shandong and Henan. However, several officials are recorded as holding different opinions:

 Yan Shigu proposed settlement north of the Yellow River, remaining in tribes, as vassals.
 Li Baiyao proposed scattered settlement north of the Yellow River, with a khan for each tribe, all answering to a protector general at Dingxiang.
 Dou Jing (竇靜) proposed scattering chieftains and their people, and imperial clan daughters be given to chieftains as wives to better control them as vassals.

Two key opinions, given by two chancellors, emerged from the discussion:

 Wen Yanbo proposed settlement on vacant lands in the northern prefectures within Tang borders, remaining in tribal form.
 Wei Zheng proposed settlement outside of Tang boundaries on their own lands.

Wen Yanbo's proposal was accepted. Two commandants overseeing ten new nominal prefectures (four for Ashina Shibobi's people, and six for Illig Qaghan's people) were created. Ashina Sunishi was made a prince. Ashina Simo was made a prince and given the Tang imperial surname Li (and is also known as Li Simo.) A large number of other chieftains were given general ranks. The new nobility were settled in or near Chang'an. Taizong ransomed Han slaves from Turkic owners. Thereafter, Turkic cavalry were often requisitioned to supplement regular Tang troops on various campaigns, such as the 634 campaign against Tuyuhun.

Meanwhile, Xueyantuo largely inherited the Khaganate's former territory and vassals, creating the Xueyantuo Kaganate. Yi'nan remained nominally submissive to Tang, remaining formally respectful to Taizong, while at the same time trying to affirm Xueyantuo's control over the region. The Khaganate's former vassals of the Khitan, Xī (奚), and Xí (霫) tribes directly submitted to the Tang, as did the city kingdom of Yiwu (伊吾).

Brief attempt to recreate Eastern Turkic Khaganate under Ashina Simo 

In 639, Ashina Jiesheshuai, Ashina Shibobi's brother, attempted to assassinate Taizong. Ashina Jiesheshuai was said to live immorally and corruptly; he resented being rebuked by Ashina Shibobi, and in turn falsely accused Ashina Shibobi of treason. Taizong disliked Ashina Jiesheshuai for the false accusation and refused to promote him. Ashina Jiesheshuai formed a conspiracy with 40-some of his former subordinates and Ashina Hexian'gu (阿史那賀暹鶻), Ashina Shibobi's to kill Taizong. On 19 May 639, they hid outside Taizong's palace, intending to charge inside at dawn when the gates opened to allow Li Zhi, the Prince of Jin, to leave. However, Li Zhi did not leave early because of strong winds, so Ashina Jiesheshuai attacked the gate rather than risk discovery after dawn. Imperial guard commander Sun Wukai (孫武開) led a resolute defence; after killing tens of guardsmen, Ashina Jiesheshuai fled northward on guard horses. The conspirators were captured; Ashina Hexian'gu was exiled and the remainder were executed.

The assassination attempt provoked a change to the policy of Turkic resettlement. On 13 August 639, Taizong ordered the resettlement of Eastern Turks and Xiongnu north of the Yellow River between the Great Wall and the Gobi Desert. Ashina Simo was created as the Yiminishuqilibi Khan (or Qilibi Khan for short) to govern them. The Eastern Turks feared the Xueyantuo and initially refused; Taizong responded by issuing an edict to Yi'nan, delivered by official Guo Siben (郭嗣本), stating:

Yi'nan was unhappy with the Eastern Turkic Khaganate's reestablishment but signalled compliance.  The Eastern Turks remained willing to follow Ashina Simo north, and the Khaganate was reestablished as a Tang vassal. Taizong also made Ashina Zhong (阿史那忠, Ashina Sunishi's son) and Ashina Nishou (阿史那泥熟) princes to assist Ashina Simo — although, perhaps foreshadowing what would eventually happen, Ashina Zhong was said to miss life in Chang'an so much that he begged all imperial emissaries sent to the Khaganate to intercede to allow him to return to Chang'an, a request that Taizong eventually approved. In spring 640, Taizong established a general post near the Khaganate to help defend it.

In spring 641, Ashina Simo's people finally crossed the Yellow River, and he established his headquarters at Dingxiang. He was said to have 30,000 households, 40,000 troops, and 90,000 warhorses. Ashina Simo requested, and received, permission from Taizong to withdraw south of the Great Wall should the fledgling Khaganate be attacked by the stronger Xueyantuo.

In winter 641, Yi'nan believed that the ritual journey to Mount Tai by Taizong and the Tang army presented an opportunity to quickly destroy the Khaganate. An Xueyantuo army was deployed to attack Khaganate; it was led by Dadu (大度), Yi'nan's son, and  also included troops conscripted from the vassal Tiele tribes of the Bayegu (拔也古), Tongluo (同羅), Pugu (僕骨), Uyghurs (回纥), Adie (阿跌), and Xí (霫). An anticipated, Ashina Simo was forced to withdraw behind the Great Wall to Shuo Prefecture (朔州, roughly modern Shuozhou, Shanxi) and seek emergency aid. The Tang responded with an army led by General Li Shiji, assisted by Generals Zhang Jian (張儉), Li Daliang, Zhang Shigui (張士貴), and Li Xiyu (李襲譽). The Xueyantuo suffered a major defeat and heavy casualties in the new year of 642 and retreated. A Tang emissary was sent to rebuke Yi'nan but no further action was taken against the Xueyantuo. The Xueyantuo continued to harass the Khagante, while attempting to maintain peaceful relations with the Tang; at one point Yi'nan was engaged to Taizong's daughter Princess Xinxing, but Taizong regretted the arrangement and cancelled the marriage in 643 on the pretense that Yi'nan's bride price (with livestock) was not paid for on time. More Tang emissaries were sent to order the Xueyantuo to stop attacking the Khaganate, to which Yi'nan:

Around the new year 645, the Khaganate collapsed; apparently its population was pressured by the Xueyantuo to abandon Ashina Simo. At this time, the Tang were preparing to attack Goguryeo and may not have been able to respond to an Xueyantuo attack. The Eastern Turks resettled south of the Yellow River in the  Sheng (勝州, also in modern Hohhot, but south of the Yellow River) and Xiazhou (夏州, roughly modern Yulin) Prefectures. Taizong endorsed the migration over the opposition of his officials. Ashina Simo was made a general upon returning to China. The Tang made no further attempts to create an Eastern Turkic vassal.

Later campaign against Ashina Tuobo 

Yi'nan remained formally submissive to Tang and died in 645. Duomi Khan Bazhuo, Yi'nan's son and successor, was hostile to the Tang. The Xueyantuo Kaganate was destroyed in 646 by the Tang and the Uyghurs.

After the fall of the first Eastern Turkic Khaganate, Khaganate prince Ashina Hubo had refused to submit to the Xueyantuo and instead had settled north of the Xueyantuo. By the end of the Xueyantuo Kaganate, Ashina Hubo claimed the title of Yizhuchebi Khan (or Chebi Khan in short) and sought to reestablish the Eastern Turkic Khaganate. In winter 647, Ashina Hubo sent his son Ashina Sabolo (阿史那沙鉢羅) to the Tang to offer tribute, and also offered to personally visit Taizong - in fact, Ashina Hubo had no intention of doing so, as was discovered by Tang General Guo Guangjing (郭廣敬) who was sent to escort him. In  In spring 649, Taizong sent an army of Uyghurs and Pugu (僕骨) troops, led by General Gao Kan (高侃), against Ashina Hubo. Taizong died in summer 649. Gao Kan returned to Chang'an in fall 650 having defeated and captured Ashina Hubo. Taizong successor, Emperor Gaozong, released Ashina Hubo and made him a general. For a time, this ended attempts to rebuild the Eastern Turkic Khaganate.

See also 
 Transition from Sui to Tang
 Emperor Taizong's campaign against Xueyantuo
 Tang campaigns against the Western Tujue
 Turks in the Tang military

References

Citations

Sources 

 Zizhi Tongjian, vols. 183, 184, 185, 186, 187, 188, 189, 190, 191, 192, 193, 194, 195, 196, 197.
 Bo Yang Edition of the Zizhi Tongjian, vols. 44, 45, 46, 47.
 Bo Yang, Outlines of the History of the Chinese (中國人史綱), vol. 2, pp. 509–512.
 Old Book of Tang, vol. 194, part 1.
 New Book of Tang, vol. 215, part 1.

630s conflicts
Wars involving the Tang dynasty
Military history of the Göktürks
Xueyantuo
Chinese Central Asia
630
Emperor Taizong of Tang